Joseph Dixon 1806 - 1866 was an Irish Roman Catholic Archbishop of Armagh and Primate of All-Ireland.

Early life and education

Dixon was born in Coalisland, Co. Tyrone in 1806 and entered Maynooth College at the age of sixteen. He was ordained priest in 1829. He was initially appointed as Junior Dean of the College, rising to Senior Dean in 1833. In 1834 he was appointed to the chair of Sacred Scripture and Hebrew, a post he occupied for the next eighteen years. His class had an average of 200 students, amongst whom was John McEvilly, afterwards Archbishop of Tuam.

Archbishop of Armagh

As Primate of Armagh he held an important synod in 1854, at which all the bishops of the northern province assisted with their theologians. In the same year he began completing the unfinished cathedral of Armagh and almost accomplished the work before his death. In 1856 he formed the diocesan chapter consisting of thirteen members. 

During his incumbency he brought some religious congregations into the diocese, viz. the Sisters of Charity of St. Vincent de Paul (1855), who opened a house in Drogheda; the Marist Fathers (1851) who opened a college and novitiate in Dundalk, and the Vincentian Fathers who were placed in charge of the ecclesiastical seminary the same year. The primate was a defender of the Holy See and at a public meeting in Drogheda denounced Napoleon III for complicity in the acts of the Italian revolutionists. His speech and subsequent letter to the Freeman's Journal created a sensation and the emperor made them a subject of complaint to Pope Pius IX. Dixon was the organizer of the Irish Brigade in the papal service.

Works

Dixon's professorship was signalized by his "Introduction to the Sacred Scriptures", a work praised by Cardinal Wiseman. The first edition appeared in 1852 and a second in 1875.

References

Attribution

1806 births
1866 deaths
Roman Catholic archbishops of Armagh
People from Coalisland
Alumni of St Patrick's College, Maynooth